Harwich is a town in Essex.

Harwich may also refer to:

 Harwich (UK Parliament constituency)
 Harwich, Massachusetts, United States of America
 Harwich Force, a squadron of the British Royal Navy
 Harwich International Port, Essex, England
 HMS Harwich, several ships of the British Royal Navy